Grobiņas sporta centrs is a Latvian football club based in Grobiņa and plays in the 2nd tier of Latvian football Latvian First League and the Latvian Football Cup.
In 2016 Grobiņas SC won the Kurzeme Regional League and therefore qualified for the 2nd League final tournament in which they won as well (beating SK Cēsis in finals) and with that earning promotion to First League. In their First League debut season they achieved 4th place.

Grobiņas SC also have agreement with FK Liepāja, thus having regular players joining/getting loaned from Liepaja.

Season By Season Results
{|class="wikitable"
|-bgcolor="#efefef"
! Season
!    Division (Name)
! Pl.
! W
! D
! L
! GS
! GA
! P
!Latvian Football Cup
|-
|align=center|2010
|align=center|3rd (2.līga Kurzeme)
|align=center|8
|align=center|1
|align=center|1
|align=center|6
|align=center|9
|align=center|19
|align=center|4
|align=center bgcolor=|did not participate
|-
|align=center|2011
|align=center|2nd (2.līga Kurzeme)
|align=center|12
|align=center|?
|align=center|?
|align=center|?
|align=center|?
|align=center|?
|align=center|?
|align=center bgcolor=|did not participate
|-
|align=center|2012
|align=center|6th (2.līga Kurzeme)
|align=center|12
|align=center|4
|align=center|0
|align=center|8
|align=center|24
|align=center|29
|align=center|12
|align=center bgcolor=|3rd round
|-
|align=center|2013
|align=center|did not participate
|align=center|-
|align=center|-
|align=center|-
|align=center|-
|align=center|-
|align=center|-
|align=center|-
|align=center bgcolor=|did not participate
|-
|align=center|2014
|align=center|2nd (2.līga Kurzeme)
|align=center|8
|align=center|5
|align=center|1
|align=center|2
|align=center|27
|align=center|8
|align=center|16
|align=center bgcolor=|2nd round
|-
|align=center|2015
|align=center|3rd (2.līga Kurzeme)
|align=center|10
|align=center|6
|align=center|1
|align=center|3
|align=center|24
|align=center|16
|align=center|19
|align=center bgcolor=|4th Round
|-
|align=center|2016
|align=center|1st (2.līga Kurzeme)
|align=center|10
|align=center|10
|align=center|0
|align=center|0
|align=center|39
|align=center|4
|align=center|30
|align=center bgcolor=|2nd Round
|-
|align=center|2017
|align=center|4th (First League)
|align=center|22
|align=center|14
|align=center|2
|align=center|6
|align=center|62
|align=center|41
|align=center|44
|align=center bgcolor=|1st Round
|}

Players

First-team squad
As of 10 November 2021.

References

External links
facebook
grobinasports.lv

Football clubs in Latvia
Grobiņa
2009 establishments in Latvia
Association football clubs established in 2009
Latvian First League